Cops is a single player arcade game developed by Nova Productions and published by Atari.  It is based on the American TV program of the same name.

Gameplay
Cops is a police simulation game that uses digitized footage filmed in Los Angeles. It offers two types of gameplay, where the player is a cop who must either shoot armed criminals while protecting the innocent or chase after escaping criminals in the patrol car.

Reception
Next Generation reviewed the game, rating it three stars out of five, and stated that "While it's definitely not the next level of arcade entertainment, Cops has enough going to make it worth a few extra games at its steeply-priced play." RePlay reported it was the third most-popular deluxe arcade game at the time.

References

1994 video games
Arcade video games
Arcade-only video games
Atari arcade games
Full motion video based games
Light gun games
Video games about police officers
Video games based on television series
Video games developed in the United Kingdom